Pella carolina is a species of rove beetle in the genus Pella in the subfamily Aleocharinae. It was discovered by Casey in 1911.

References

Aleocharinae
Beetles described in 1911